Greatest Hits is a compilation album released by R&B group DeBarge on Gordy Records.

The album was their first compilation of contains some of their biggest hits, including "Rhythm of the Night", "Who's Holding Donna Now", "All This Love", "Time Will Reveal", "The Heart Is Not So Smart" and "You Wear It Well".

Track listing
 "Rhythm of the Night" - 3:48
 "Who's Holding Donna Now" - 4:27
 "You Wear It Well" - 4:45
 "Stop! Don't Tease Me" - 6:00
 "I Like It" - 4:20
 "All This Love" - 5:22
 "Time Will Reveal" - 4:11
 "Love Me In a Special Way" - 4:13
 "Share My World" - 5:37
 "Single Heart" - 3:33
 "The Heart Is Not So Smart" - 4:35

DeBarge albums
1986 greatest hits albums
Gordy Records albums